Hyun Young-min (born 25 December 1979) is a South Korean football coach and a former player. He is the manager of the Under-18 squad of Ulsan Hyundai.

Career

Club career
Hyun Young-min started his career at Ulsan Hyundai Horang-i in Korea Republic. At the beginning of 2006 Russian club Rubin Kazan tried to sign him, but he refused to play outside two Russian metropolises, Saint Petersburg and Moscow. Shortly thereafter he moved to Zenit Saint Petersburg and he played for them until 2007. In 2007, he returned to Ulsan Hyundai Horang-i.

In December 2009, he was traded with FC Seoul's captain Kim Chi-Gon.

International career
He played for the Korea Republic national football team and was a participant at the 2002 FIFA World Cup.

After Retirement 
In June 2021, Hyun signed a contract with DH Entertainment

Club career statistics

Honours

Club
Ulsan Hyundai Horang-i / Ulsan Hyundai FC
K League Champion : 2005
K League Runner-up : 2002, 2003
League Cup Winner : 2007
League Cup Runner-up : 2002, 2005

FC Seoul
K League
Winners (1): 2010
League Cup
Winners (1): 2010

International

 FIFA World Cup fourth place: 2002
 EAFF East Asian Cup (1) : 2003

Filmography

Television show

References

External links
 
 Hyun Young-min – National Team Stats at KFA 
 Russian Premier League Player Profile 
 

South Korean footballers
South Korean expatriate footballers
South Korea international footballers
Association football midfielders
Ulsan Hyundai FC players
FC Zenit Saint Petersburg players
FC Seoul players
Seongnam FC players
Jeonnam Dragons players
Russian Premier League players
K League 1 players
2002 CONCACAF Gold Cup players
2002 FIFA World Cup players
2004 AFC Asian Cup players
Expatriate footballers in Russia
South Korean expatriate sportspeople in Russia
Sportspeople from South Jeolla Province
Konkuk University alumni
1979 births
Living people
Asian Games medalists in football
Footballers at the 2002 Asian Games
Asian Games bronze medalists for South Korea
Medalists at the 2002 Asian Games
South Korean football managers